Gregoras Iberitzes was a Byzantine nobleman and senior military leader of the early 10th century.

Life
Gregoras' surname may suggest an Iberian origin. He was related by marriage to the powerful Doukas clan, with whom his career was intertwined. He was almost certainly the father-in-law of Constantine Doukas, son of general Andronikos Doukas. When the latter rose in revolt in the winter of 906/7, possibly due to the machinations of the powerful eunuch Samonas, Gregoras, who at the time held the supreme military position of Domestic of the Schools, was sent by Emperor Leo VI the Wise (reigned 886–912) to confront the Doukai, who had taken refuge in the fortress of Kabala near Ikonion. Andronikos however called upon the Arabs for aid, and in spring of 907, an army under the Abbasid governor of Tarsus, Rustam ibn Baradu, arrived to help him. According to al-Tabari, Andronikos managed to take Gregoras captive, defeat his troops, and flee to the Abbasid Caliphate.

At the latest under Leo's brother and successor, Alexander (r. 912–913), he rose to the supreme court rank of magistros. As a result, he is possibly to be identified with the nameless magistros who in late 912 delivered letters from the emperor and Patriarch Nicholas I Mystikos to Pope Anastasius III. Following Alexander's death on 6 June 913, Constantine Doukas tried to seize the throne. He entered Constantinople and spent the night in the mansion of Gregoras, where he planned his action with his followers. The usurpation attempt failed with the death of Constantine in the ensuing melee at the imperial palace, whereupon Gregoras and Leo Choirosphaktes sought sanctuary in the Hagia Sophia. They were forcibly removed, tonsured, and sent to the Stoudios Monastery.

Gregoras' mansion, which lay in the acropolis of ancient Byzantium, apparently passed to John Toubakes.

References

Sources
 

9th-century births
10th-century deaths
10th-century Byzantine people
Byzantine prisoners and detainees
Byzantine rebels
Magistroi
Studite monks
Year of birth unknown
Year of death unknown
Domestics of the Schools
Byzantine people of Georgian descent